Milinko Pantić (Serbian Cyrillic: Милинко Пантић, born 5 September 1966) is a Serbian retired footballer and current manager.

Playing career
Pantić spent the first six seasons of his professional career with FK Partizan between 1985 and 1991.

He then moved on to Greek Alpha Ethniki league where he played until 1995 for Athens side Panionios.

At almost 29 years of age, he was brought to Atlético Madrid by their new coach Radomir Antić who knew Pantić well from his Partizan days. The move turned out to be a hit as Pantić's creative midfield presence provided the extra edge to Atlético side that won the double (La Liga and Copa del Rey) in the 1995–96 season. Pantić contributed with 10 goals in 41 appearances, including the winner in the 1996 Copa del Rey Final, and countless assists. In the 1996–97 UEFA Champions League he scored five goals, finishing as the top-scorer of the tournament (to this date he is the only Atlético Madrid player to achieve this). He spent two more seasons in Madrid with a total of 18 goals in 106 matches in his career there.

He moved to Le Havre AC during summer 1998 for a season. In the summer of 1999, Pantić transferred back to Panionios where he spent the last year of his playing career.

He earned two caps for the FR Yugoslavia national team in 1996.

Coaching career
Pantić went back to Atlético Madrid as a coach in Atletico's youth system, working with kids 3 to 9 years of age in the club's training facility in Majadahonda. From there he moved up the ranks coaching different youth squads. He became head of the youth and developing squads at the club while managing certain squads at the same time.

During the summer of 2011 Pantić became coach of Atlético Madrid B (Atlético Madrid reserve squad) after his great success with the youth and developing squads at the club and after just about missing out on being coach of the first team.

He also plays for Atlético Madrid's Indoor-Soccer team, competing in the veteran league which comprises nine clubs that have won the La Liga title throughout history.

Pantić was appointed as manager of Azerbaijan Premier League team FC Baku in June 2013, little over a year later, 24 July 2014, Pantić left the club by mutual consent.

On 5 July 2016, Pantić was announced as the head coach of China League One team Dalian Yifang.

Accolades
Paul Lambert in naming the best one to eleven he played against named Pantic as the direct opponent who gave him his most difficult time during Lambert's playing career.

Honours
Partizan
Yugoslav First League: 1985-86, 1986-87
Yugoslav Cup: 1988-89
Yugoslav Super Cup: 1989

Atlético de Madrid
La Liga: 1995–96
Copa del Rey: 1995–96

Individual
UEFA Champions League Top Scorer: 1996–97

References

External links
 
 

1966 births
Living people
Sportspeople from Loznica
Yugoslav footballers
Serbian footballers
Association football midfielders
Serbia and Montenegro international footballers
FK Partizan players
Panionios F.C. players
Atlético Madrid footballers
Le Havre AC players
Yugoslav First League players
Super League Greece players
La Liga players
Ligue 1 players
UEFA Champions League top scorers
Expatriate footballers in France
Expatriate footballers in Greece
Expatriate footballers in Spain
Serbian expatriate footballers
Serbia and Montenegro expatriate footballers
Serbia and Montenegro footballers
Yugoslav expatriate sportspeople in Greece
Serbia and Montenegro expatriate sportspeople in France
Serbia and Montenegro expatriate sportspeople in Greece
Serbia and Montenegro expatriate sportspeople in Spain
Serbian expatriate sportspeople in Azerbaijan
Serbian expatriate sportspeople in China
NK Olimpija Ljubljana (1945–2005) players
Atlético Madrid B managers
FC Baku managers
Expatriate football managers in Azerbaijan
Expatriate football managers in China
Serbian football managers